John McCandlish Phillips, Jr. (December 4, 1927 – April 9, 2013) was an American journalist and author on religious subjects. He worked at The New York Times from 1952 to 1973 before focusing his career on evangelical Christianity.

Life and career
Phillips was born in Glen Cove, New York and graduated from Brookline High School in Massachusetts. He served in the United States Army from 1950 to 1952 at Fort Holabird, where he became a born-again Christian. In 1962, he helped found the New Testament Missionary Fellowship in Manhattan.

In 1965, despite death threats, McCandlish exposed the Jewish background of senior Ku Klux Klan and American Nazi Party official Daniel Burros. Burros committed suicide the day the article was published, and McCandlish won the Page One Award from the Newspaper Guild of New York for the piece.

Phillips died in Manhattan from complications of pneumonia. The World Journalism Institute's John McCandlish Phillips Director of Mentoring is named in his honor. ”

Selected publications
The Bible, the Supernatural and the Jews (1970)
The Spirit World (1972)
City Notebook (1974)
What Every Christian Should Know About the Supernatural (1987)

References

External links
McCandlish Phillips Chair of Journalism

1927 births
American male journalists
2013 deaths
The New York Times writers
20th-century American journalists
Brookline High School alumni